The Travers Stakes is an American Grade I Thoroughbred horse race held at Saratoga Race Course in Saratoga Springs, New York. It is nicknamed the "Mid-Summer Derby" and is the third-ranked race for American three-year-olds according to international classifications, behind only the Kentucky Derby and Belmont Stakes. First held in 1864, it is the oldest stakes race in the United States specifically for 3-year-olds, and was named for William R. Travers, the president of the old Saratoga Racing Association. His horse, Kentucky, won the first running of the Travers. The race was not run in 1896, 1898, 1899, 1900, 1911, and 1912.
 
The race is the highlight of the summer race meeting at Saratoga, just as the Belmont Stakes is the highlight of the spring meeting at Belmont Park. The purse was increased to $1,000,000 in 1999 and then to $1,250,000 in 2014. The purse for the 2015 renewal was increased to $1,600,000 due to the presence of Triple Crown winner American Pharoah.

From 2018 until 2022 the Travers Stakes was sponsored by Jim McIngvale under the name of retired stallion Runhappy. The 154th Travers Stakes was run on Saturday, August 26, 2023.

Overview

The Travers is run at scale weights: colts and geldings carry  and fillies carry .

The Travers has been run at four different distances:

: 1864 to 1889
: 1890 to 1892
: 1893, 1894, 1897 and 1904 to present
: 1895 and 1901 to 1903

The winner of the race is presented with a blanket of carnations, which is approximately 10 feet long and requires about 1,500 flowers. The carnations are red and white, which are the colors of Saratoga Race Track. The blanket is prepared the night before the race by a Saratoga florist.

The winner's trophy, known as the Man o' War Cup, was designed by Tiffany & Co. Its namesake, Man o' War, won this race in 1920. The trophy was won by Man o' War in a special match race in 1920 against Sir Barton, the 1919 American Triple Crown winner. The wife of owner Samuel Riddle donated the trophy in 1936 as the permanent award for winning the race. Each year, the name of the winner is inscribed on the Cup. A gold-plated replica is presented to the winner each year by a member of the Riddle family.

Since 1961, the colors of the Travers winner have been painted onto a canoe which sits on a pond in the infield. The canoe itself has been a fixture at the track since 1926.

Notable moments

In 1941, Whirlaway became the only horse ever to win both the American Triple Crown and the Travers Stakes, sometimes referred to as a "superfecta".

In 1962, arguably the greatest Travers in history took place. Jaipur won by a nose-bob in track record time over the arguably more talented Ridan after a long, head-to-head battle over the entire mile and a quarter. Still written and talked about today, the race is listed in the 2006 book Horse Racing's Top 100 Moments written by the staff of Blood-Horse Publications. The race result determined which colt would be named the 1962 U.S. Champion 3-Year-Old Horse.

In 1978, Affirmed finished the Travers ahead of rival Alydar but was disqualified for crowding Alydar off the rail. Alydar was awarded the win. It was the last of 10 times the two would race each other in one of the sport's greatest rivalries.

In 1982, Runaway Groom, the Champion Canadian Three year old arrived at Saratoga after competing in the Canadian Triple Crown, having won the Prince of Wales Stakes and Breeders' Stakes, and finishing second in the Queen's Plate. At the Travers that year, Runaway Groom became the second horse in racing history to beat the three winners of the Triple Crown series in the same race, defeating Kentucky Derby winner Gato Del Sol, Preakness Stakes winner Aloma's Ruler, and Belmont Stakes winner Conquistador Cielo. Sun Briar was the first to do so in the 1918 Travers Stakes.
 
The 1997 Travers was another of the memorable races in its history, as it saw U.S. Racing Hall of Fame jockeys Jerry Bailey and Chris McCarron (aboard Behrens and Deputy Commander respectively) in a home-stretch duel wherein Deputy Commander prevailed. Adding to the drama was a thunderstorm which produced hail 24 hours before the race, and the uncertainty around whether or not McCarron would be present after the recent death of his mother.

In 2001, Point Given won the Travers before a record Travers Stakes day attendance of 60,486. The total betting handle was $34,529,273, which was a Saratoga record at that time.

On August 25, 2012, Alpha and Golden Ticket finished in a dead heat for first place – meaning they could not be separated in the photo finish. Following the race, two canoes were put in the infield pond to commemorate the winners. It was the first official tie in the race's history and the winning owners split the $800,000 first-place prize money. In 1874, Attila and Acrobat dead heated but were forced to run off to break the tie. 

The 146th Travers Stakes was run on August 29, 2015.  Because Triple Crown winner American Pharoah was in the race the purse was raised to $1.6 million and NYRA capped attendance at 50,000, making the event a sellout for the first time ever.  The 2015 race reaffirmed Saratoga's reputation as the "graveyard of champions" when Keen Ice defeated American Pharoah.

The 147th Travers was equally notable as Arrogate rolled home to win by 13 1/2 lengths and set a new stakes record, finishing the race in 1:59:36. Arrogate's victory helped Bob Baffert to avenge his loss the previous year with American Pharoah.

1921 Travers 
The 1921 Travers Stakes is known for a betting scandal. In those days, bookmaking rather than parimutuel wagering was the primary method of taking bets on horse races.

The original field was fairly light with the favorite, the filly Prudery, owned by Harry Payne Whitney, facing no serious competition. Then Arnold Rothstein entered his colt, Sporting Blood, ostensibly to pick up second place. A few days before the race, however, Rothstein had learned that Prudery was off her feed. He knew he might have a real chance to win. Initially, the odds on the filly were 1-4, while Rothstein's colt was 5–2. On the day of the race, however, a leading three-year-old, Grey Lag, was entered by trainer Sam Hildreth. Grey Lag immediately became the favorite, with Prudery the second choice, driving the odds on Sporting Blood up to 3–1. Rothstein bet $150,000 on his horse. Just before post time, Grey Lag was scratched with no explanation. During the race, Sporting Blood overtook the ailing Prudery, gaining his owner nearly half a million dollars, including wagers and the purse.

Although many smelled foul play, it was never proven that Hildreth received any payoff or that there was a conspiracy between him and Rothstein.

Records
Speed record: (at current distance of  miles)
 1:59.36 – Arrogate (2016)

Most wins by a jockey:
 6 – Javier Castellano (2006, 2010, 2011, 2014, 2015, 2018)

Most wins by a trainer:
 5 – Bert Mulholland (1939, 1950, 1951, 1962, 1963)

Most wins by an owner:
 5 – Dwyer Brothers Stable (1881, 1883, 1886, 1888, 1890)
 5 – George D. Widener, Jr. (1939, 1950, 1951, 1962, 1963)
 5 – Rokeby Stable (1964, 1969, 1972, 1987, 1993)

Record victory margin:
 22 lengths – Damascus (1967)

Winners

To date, Whirlaway is the only Triple Crown winner to win the Travers Stakes.

Sire lines
 the Darley Arabian (1700c) sire line (all branched through the Eclipse (1764) line) produced 126 Stakes winners (119 colts, 4 geldings, 3 fillies), including all winners from 2009 to present. The main branches of this sire line are:
 the King Fergus (1775) branch (all branched through the Voltigeur (1847) line), produced 15 winners. His sire line continued primarily through his son Vedette (1854) with 12 winners, due primarily to his son Galopin (1872) with 8 winners (exclusively through St. Simon (1881), most recently Thunder Rumble in 1992)
 the Potoooooooo (1773) branch produced 111 winners (all branched through the Waxy (1790) line). The primary branch of this sire line is through Whalebone (1807), which has produced 108 winners. In turn, the primary branch continues through Sir Hercules (1826), which has produced 82 winners, and then the Birdcatcher (1833) branch which produced 76 winners. From Birdcatcher, the branch of The Baron (1842) has produced 72 winners (exclusively through the Stockwell (1849) line). Birdcatcher's grandson Doncaster (1870) sired Bend Or (1877), whose sire line accounts for 65 winners. The main branch of the Bend Or sire line continued through his son Bona Vista (1889) with 52 winners, exclusively through the Phalaris (1913) line, which has dominated in the last several decades (including all winners from 2009 to present) through the following sons:  
the Pharamond (1925) branch (4 winners, most recently Chompion in 1968);
the Sickle (1924) branch (21 winners exclusively through Native Dancer (1950) with his win in the 1953 Travers Stakes, exclusively through his son Raise a Native (1961) with 20 winners, down through Mr Prospector (1970) with 17 winners through 9 different sons: Rhythm, with his win in the 1990 Travers Stakes, and 8 other sons through their progeny (most recently Arrogate (through Mr Prospector's son Fappiano (1977) with 5 winners) in 2016)); 
the Pharos (1920) branch, which has produced all winners from 2017 to present (27 winners all branched through the Nearco (1935) line, through his sons Royal Charger (1942), Nearctic (1954), and Nasrullah (1940)). The Royal Charger branch produced 5 winners (most recently Catholic Boy in 2018), the Nearctic branch produced 7 winners (exclusively through his son Northern Dancer (1961), most recently Epicenter in 2022), while the Nasrullah branch produced 15 winners primarily due to his son Bold Ruler (1954) with 10 winners (primarily through his son Boldnesian (1963) with 6 winners (exclusively through the A.P. Indy (1989) line), most recently Essential Quality in 2021).
 Special notes:
 The Whalebone (1807) branch produced two main lines: the primary branch of Sir Hercules (1826), and the secondary branch of Camel (1822) which produced 21 winners (exclusively through the Touchstone (1831) line). The Camel branch continued primarily through two of this grandsons: the Orlando (1841) branch (8 winners, primarily through Himyar (1875) with 6 winners, most recently Holy Bull in 1994) and the Newminster (1848) branch (11 winners, primarily through the Bay Ronald (1893) line with 6 winners, most recently Loud in 1970). A third branch through Whalebone is via Waverley (exclusively through the Ben Brush (1893) line) which produced 5 winners, most recently Thinking Cap in 1955.
 The Sir Hercules (1826) branch produced two main lines: the primary branch of Birdcatcher (1833), and the secondary branch of Faugh-a-Ballagh (1841) which produced 6 winners (exclusively through the Leamington (1853) line), most recently 1894 Travers Stakes winner Henry of Navarre.
 The Stockwell (1849) branch produced two main lines: the primary branch of Doncaster (1870), and the secondary branch of St Albans (1857) which produced 5 winners (exclusively through the Rock Sand (1900) line), most recently 1963 Travers Stakes winner Crewman.
 The Bend Or (1877) branch produced two main lines: the primary branch of Bona Vista (1889), and the secondary branch of Ormonde (1883) which produced 8 winners (exclusively through the Teddy (1913) line), most recently 1991 Travers Stakes winner Corporate Report.
 the Godolphin Arabian (1724c) sire line produced 14 winners (13 colts, 1 filly). The main branches of this sire (all branched through the West Australian (1850) line) are:
 the Solon (1861) branch produced 3 winners, most recently Thanksgiving in 1938)
 the Australian (1858) branch produced 11 winners, including:
 Joe Daniels (1869), winner of the 1872 Travers Stakes
 Attila (1871), winner of the 1874 Travers Stakes
 Baden-Baden (1874), winner of the 1877 Travers Stakes
 the Springbok (1870) branch produced 1 winner (most recently of the Vallera in 1891)
the Spendthrift (1876) branch produced 7 winners including: 
 Stowaway (1890), winner of the 1893 Travers Stakes
the Hastings (1893) branch produced 6 winners (exclusively through the Fair Play (1905) line), including 1921 Travers Stakes winner Sporting Blood (1918) and 5 winners through the Man o' War (1917) line, including his win in the 1920 Travers Stakes, and 4 direct male progeny, most recently Colonel John in 2008.
 the Byerley Turk (1680c) sire line produced 14 winners (10 colts, 1 gelding, 3 fillies). The main branches of this sire (all branched through the Herod (1758) line) are:
 the Woodpecker (1773) branch produced 4 winners (all branched through the Buzzard (1787) line). The main branches of this sire line are:
the Castrel (1801) branch produced 1 winner, most recently Sir John in 1890
the Selim (1802) branch produced 3 winners (all branched through the Virgil (1864) line). The main branches of this sire are:
 Carley B (1879), winner of the 1882 Travers Stakes
the Hindoo (1878) branch produced 2 winners, including his win in the 1878 Travers Stakes, and 1 direct sire line progeny, most recently Dandelion in 1905
 the Florizel (1768) branch produced 10 winners, all branched through the Lexington (1850) line. Lexington sired 9 winners plus one additional direct sire line progeny, including:
Kentucky, winner of the 1864 Travers Stakes
Maiden, winner of the 1865 Travers Stakes
Merrill, winner of the 1866 Travers Stakes
The Banshee, winner of the 1868 Travers Stakes
Kingfisher, winner of the 1870 Travers Stakes
Harry Bassett, winner of the 1871 Travers Stakes
Tom Bowling, winner of the 1873 Travers Stakes
the Lightning branch produced 1 winner (most recently D' Artagnan in 1875)
Sultana, winner of the 1876 Travers Stakes
Duke of Magenta, winner of the 1878 Travers Stakes

Travers Stakes winners with male-line descendants including other Travers Stakes winners
 Native Dancer (1953 winner) – 20 colts; most recently Arrogate (2015)
 Man o' War (1920 winner) – 4 colts; most recently Colonel John (2008)
 Broomstick (1904 winner) – 3 colts; most recently Arise (1949)
 Eight Thirty (1939 winner) – 2 colts; most recently Crewman (1963)
 Sword Dancer (1959 winner) – 2 colts; most recently Corporate Report (1991)
 Alydar (1988 winner) – 2 colts; most recently Will's Way (1996)
 Forty Niner (1988 winner) – 2 colts; most recently Flower Alley (2005)
 Bernardini (2006 winner) – 2 colts; most recently Alpha (2012)
 Sir Dixon (1888 winner) – 1 colt; Blues (1901)
 Hindoo (1881 winner) – 1 colt; Dandelion (1905)
 Sun Briar (1918 winner) – 1 colt; Sun Flag (1924)
 Tompion (1960 winner) – 1 colt; Chompion (1968)
 Jaipur (1962 winner) – 1 colt; Jatski (1977)
 Key to the Mint (1972 winner) – 1 colt; Java Gold (1987)
 Damascus (1967 winner) – 1 colt; Corporate Report (1991)
 Spur (1916 winner) – 1 colt; Holy Bull (1994)
 Easy Goer (1989 winner) – 1 colt; Will's Way (1996)
 Thunder Gulch (1995 winner) – 1 colt; Point Given (2001)
 Deputy Commander (1997 winner) – 1 colt; Ten Most Wanted (2003)
 Birdstone (2004 winner) – 1 colt; Summer Bird (2009)

See also 
 Travers Stakes top three finishers and starters
 American thoroughbred racing top attended events
 Grand Slam of Thoroughbred Racing

References

External links

 Travers Stakes 1921
 Sunny Jim Fitzsimmons discusses the 1930 Travers Stakes
 Ten Things You Should Know About the Travers Stakes at Hello Race Fans!

Graded stakes races in the United States
Flat horse races for three-year-olds
Grade 1 stakes races in the United States
Horse races in New York (state)
Saratoga Race Course
Recurring sporting events established in 1864
1864 establishments in New York (state)